Hugh Bulkeley was a seventeenth century Welsh bard. It is unknown whether any of his works still survive.

References 

Welsh poets
Year of birth missing
Year of death missing